Rhea County High School is a high school in Evensville, Tennessee.  It serves Rhea County, Tennessee, which includes Dayton, Spring City and Graysville. It has an enrollment of 1,469. Its mascot is a golden eagle. It is a part of Rhea County Schools.

History
In 2013, Rhea County High School celebrated their 40th year since the school was established and Spring City and Rhea Central were brought together to form what is now well known as Rhea County High School. Also in 2013, following the 40th year celebration of the school, was the building of a new addition that spanned to cover 320,000 square feet. When this switch occurred, the middle school of Rhea County moved into the old high school so that they could have a larger space as well. With the building of the new wing came an addition to the athletic/physical health department by the addition of 3 new gyms, a brand new turf football/soccer field, and a track outlying the layout of the regulation size field

Athletics

Rhea County High School offers 14 different sports for both ladies and men at their school

Notable alumni
David Douglas, NFL player
Rachel Held Evans, writer
Andy Kelly, Arena Football League quarterback
Cory Gearrin, Major League Baseball relief pitcher
Josh Walker, NFL player

See also
 Dayton City School - This school is in its own school district
 John T. Scopes - Science v.s religion Trial

References

External links
 

Public high schools in Tennessee
Schools in Rhea County, Tennessee
1974 establishments in Tennessee
Educational institutions established in 1974